Hendrik Philip "Haas" Visser 't Hooft (September 20, 1905 in Haarlem – July 28, 1977 in Velp) was a Dutch field hockey player who competed in the 1928 Summer Olympics.

He was a member of the Dutch field hockey team, which won the silver medal. He played all four matches as forward.

External links
 
profile

1905 births
1977 deaths
Dutch male field hockey players
Olympic field hockey players of the Netherlands
Field hockey players at the 1928 Summer Olympics
Olympic silver medalists for the Netherlands
Sportspeople from Haarlem
Olympic medalists in field hockey
Medalists at the 1928 Summer Olympics
20th-century Dutch people